Yordan Louis Olivier Thimon (born 10 September 1996) is a Martiniquais football player. He plays for Club Franciscain.

International
He made his Martinique national football team debut on 29 March 2017 in a friendly against Guyana.

He was selected for the 2019 CONCACAF Gold Cup squad.

Personal life
Yordan is the brother of the Yann Thimon, who is also an Martinique international footballer.

References

External links
 
 

1996 births
Living people
Martiniquais footballers
Martinique international footballers
Association football defenders
Club Franciscain players
2019 CONCACAF Gold Cup players
2021 CONCACAF Gold Cup players